The 2015–16 Kansas State Wildcats women's basketball team will represent Kansas State University in the 2015–16 NCAA Division I women's basketball season. The Wildcats were led by second-year head coach Jeff Mittie. They play their home games at Bramlage Coliseum in Manhattan, Kansas and were members of the Big 12 Conference. They finished the season 19–13, 8–10 in Big 12 play to finish in a tie for sixth place. They lost in the quarterfinals of the Big 12 women's tournament to West Virginia. They received an at-large bid to the NCAA women's tournament where they defeated George Washington in the first round before losing to South Carolina in the second round.

Roster

Rankings
2015–16 NCAA Division I women's basketball rankings

Schedule and results 

|-
!colspan=9 style="background:#512888; color:#FFFFFF;"| Exhibition

|-
!colspan=9 style="background:#512888; color:#FFFFFF;"| Non-conference regular season

|-
!colspan=9 style="background:#512888; color:#FFFFFF;"| Big 12 regular season

|-
!colspan=9 style="background:#512888; color:#FFFFFF;"| Big 12 Women's Tournament

|-
!colspan=9 style="background:#512888; color:#FFFFFF;"| NCAA Women's Tournament

See also 
 2015–16 Kansas State Wildcats men's basketball team

References 

Kansas State Wildcats women's basketball seasons
Kansas State
Kansas State